Effia is one of the constituencies represented in the Parliament of Ghana. It elects one Member of Parliament (MP) by the first past the post system of election. Sekondi is located in the Sekondi Takoradi Metropolitan Assembly of the Western Region of Ghana.

Members of Parliament

References 

Parliamentary constituencies in the Western Region (Ghana)